Elke Doris Drüll (born 1 April 1956 in Neuss) is a German former field hockey player who competed in the 1984 Summer Olympics.

References

External links
 
 

1956 births
Living people
German female field hockey players
Olympic field hockey players of West Germany
Olympic silver medalists for West Germany
Olympic medalists in field hockey
Field hockey players at the 1984 Summer Olympics
Medalists at the 1984 Summer Olympics
Sportspeople from Neuss
20th-century German women